Nebria wallowae is a species of ground beetle in the Nebriinae subfamily that is endemic to the US state of Oregon.

References

wallowae
Beetles described in 1984
Beetles of North America
Endemic fauna of Oregon